Willy Gummesson (8 April 1944-25 April 2016) was a  Swedish footballer. He made 117 Allsvenskan appearances for Djurgårdens IF and scored two goals. He died on the 25th of April, 2016 at Danderyd Hospital following a short illness.

Honours

Club 

 Djurgårdens IF 
 Allsvenskan: 1966

References

Swedish footballers
Sweden international footballers
Allsvenskan players
Djurgårdens IF Fotboll players
1944 births
2016 deaths
Association football defenders